Vista Malls is a shopping mall chain of property developer Vista Land founded and chaired by Filipino billionaire and former politician Manny Villar. It is one of the growing major shopping mall retailers in the Philippines, along with Ayala Malls, Megaworld Lifestyle Malls, SM Supermalls and Robinsons Malls.

Shopping malls

References 

Shopping malls in the Philippines
Philippine brands